National Highway 713, commonly referred to as NH 713 is a National Highway in North East India. It is a spur road of National Highway 13.  NH-713 traverses the state of Arunachal Pradesh in India. This highway connects Joram and Koloriang via Palin in Arunachal Pradesh.

Route 
Joram - Palin - Sangram - Koloriang.

Junctions  

  Terminal near Joram.

See also
 List of National Highways in India (by Highway Number)
 List of National Highways in India by state
 National Highways Development Project

References

External links 

 NH 713 on OpenStreetMap

National highways in India
National Highways in Arunachal Pradesh